Phylloxylon xylophylloides is a species of legume in the family Fabaceae. It is found only in Madagascar.

References

Indigofereae
Endemic flora of Madagascar
Vulnerable plants
Taxonomy articles created by Polbot
Taxa named by John Gilbert Baker